Vlaanderen, originally West-Vlaanderen (founded 1952), was a Dutch-language periodical of art and culture, originally set up as the organ of the Christelijk Vlaams Kunstenaarsverbond Westvlaanderen (Christian Flemish Artists' Association West Flanders) under the chairmanship of the Christian democrat politician Jozef Storme. The title was changed in 1966. Publication ended in 2017.

References

1952 establishments in Belgium
2017 disestablishments in Belgium
Defunct magazines published in Belgium
Dutch-language magazines
Magazines established in 1952
Magazines disestablished in 2017
Bi-monthly magazines